Selina Gschwandtner (born 18 May 1994) is a German sports shooter. She competed in the women's 10 metre air rifle event at the 2016 Summer Olympics.

References

External links
 

1994 births
Living people
German female sport shooters
Olympic shooters of Germany
Shooters at the 2016 Summer Olympics
People from Altötting (district)
Sportspeople from Upper Bavaria
European Games competitors for Germany
Shooters at the 2019 European Games
21st-century German women